Oriol Soldevila Puig (born 26 March 2001) is a Spanish footballer who plays as a midfielder for Intercity.

Career
Born in Barcelona, Soldevila began playing futsal at the age of five. After training in seven-a-side football with RCD Espanyol, he continued at Atlètic Sant Just FC, where he turned down an approach from UE Cornellà in order to continue playing with his friends. In his first season of 11-a-side, his delayed growth meant that he only played the last two games, but that was enough to be scouted by Cornellà in the División de Honor Infantil.

Soldevila's performances for Cornellà attracted the attention of the two largest teams in Catalonia, FC Barcelona and Espanyol, and he joined the former's La Masia academy in 2018. He won the under-19 league in his first season and made substitute appearances in the UEFA Youth League the following year, where Barcelona were eliminated in the group. He left at the end of his second season and trialled at Birmingham City – managed by compatriot Aitor Karanka – before signing to its under-21 team in the Premier League 2.

After 19 games, four goals and five assists in his second season in England, Soldevila returned to Spain on 29 June 2022 by signing a two-year deal at CF Intercity in the third-tier Primera Federación. On 4 January 2023, during the match against former club Barcelona, in the last 32 of the Copa del Rey, he scored a hat-trick to equalise three times, although the blaugrana eventually won 4–3 after extra time; in the process, he became the first player to score a hat-trick against Barcelona since Kylian Mbappé in 2021.

Personal life
Soldevila, whose grandfather Oriol Puig was a national motorcross champion, idolised the Spanish motorcycle rider Marc Márquez. He practiced the sport himself, until his Barcelona contract prohibited him from it.

References

External links
 

Living people
2001 births
Spanish footballers
Footballers from Barcelona
Association football midfielders
Spain youth international footballers
Primera Federación players
UE Cornellà players
FC Barcelona players
Birmingham City F.C. players
CF Intercity players
Spanish expatriate footballers
Spanish expatriate sportspeople in England
Expatriate footballers in England